Plombières-lès-Dijon (literally Plombières near Dijon) is a commune in the Côte-d'Or department in eastern France.

Population

Personalities
Chantal Sébire, teacher and euthanasia activist
 Paillet, Julien (de Plombières), 1771-? (probably, cf. titles of his works, etc., at the Bibliothèque nationale de France)

See also
Communes of the Côte-d'Or department

References

Communes of Côte-d'Or